'SPARSH' is a novel interaction method to transfer data between digital devices by touch gestures. Sparsh prototype system is designed and developed by Pranav Mistry, Suranga Nanayakkara of the MIT Media Lab. Sparsh lets the user touch whatever data item he or she wants to copy from a device. At that moment, the data item is conceptually saved in the user. Next, the user touches the other device he or she wants to paste/pass the saved content into. Sparsh uses touch-based interactions as indications for what to copy and where to pass it. Technically, the actual transfer of media happens via the information cloud. The user authentication is achieved by face recognition, fingerprint detection or username-password combination. Sparsh lets the user conceptually transfer media (pictures, text, video, links) from one digital device to one's body and pass it to the other digital device by simple touch gestures. At present, Sparsh system support Android and Windows platform.

References

External links
Sparsh homepage
Sparsh video demonstration

User interfaces
MIT Media Lab